Jalland is a surname. Notable people with the surname include:

 Arthur Edgar Jalland (1889–1958), British QC, judge and politician
 Jørgen Jalland (born 1977), Norwegian footballer
 Pat Jalland (born 1941), Australian historian
 Robert Jalland (1801–1883), English architect